The Heinze River is a river of Burma. It has its source in the Tenasserim Hills and ends in the Andaman Sea in the Tanintharyi Region coast. The Heinze Islands is a small island group located 25 km to the SSW of the mouth of the Heinze River.

See also
List of rivers in Burma

References

External links
Yadana gas Development Project - Wharf construction
Yadana gas Development Project - Bridge construction

Rivers of Myanmar
Tanintharyi Region